Championship Blackjack is a 1982 video game published by PCSoftware.

Gameplay
Championship Blackjack is a game in which blackjack is played using established professional gambling rules.

Reception
Jim Zegers reviewed the game for Computer Gaming World, and stated that "If you are a beginning blackjack player, a hearty welcome to the game. You won't find a more helpful and enjoyable way of learning than Championship Blackjack. If you're an expert, counter, tournament player, or professional, you will find Championship Blackjack to be an outstanding computer game."

Reviews
PC Magazine - Dec, 1982

References

External links
Review in Kilobaud Microcomputing

1982 video games
Blackjack video games
DOS games
DOS-only games
Video games developed in the United States